Focke may mean:

Companies
 Focke-Wulf Flugzeugbau AG, a German manufacturer of civil and military aircraft during World War II
 Focke and Co, a worldwide manufacturer of packaging equipment and systems

People
 Anne Daubenspeck-Focke (née Focke, born 1922), German sculptor and painter
 Gustav Woldmar Focke (1810-1877), German physician and naturalist
 Henrich Focke (1890-1979), German aviation pioneer, co-founder of the Focke-Wulf company
Katharina Focke (1922–2016), German politician (SPD)
 Wilhelm Olbers Focke (1834–1922), German botanist

Other uses
 The Focke-Wulf Fw 190 aircraft

See also
 Fokker, a Dutch aircraft manufacturer